Bait Al Zubair is a museum, located on Al Saidiya Street, Old Muscat, Oman.

The museum has an extensive collection of ancient weapons, including khanjar, household equipments, and costumes (most of which derive from the owner's private collection). Outside the museum is a full-scale Omani village and souk.

References

External links

 Museum website
 A Brief Tour of Bait al Zubair Museum, Muscat video on YouTube

Museums with year of establishment missing
Museums in Muscat, Oman
History museums in Oman
Military and war museums
Open-air museums
Old Muscat
Outdoor structures in Oman